Henry Rigden Butt (27 December 1865 – 21 December 1928) was an English cricketer who played first-class cricket for Sussex County Cricket Club and the Marylebone Cricket Club between 1890 and 1912. Butt also played three Test matches for England on their tour to South Africa in 1895–96. He later went on to become an umpire, and stood in that role in six Tests. His popularity was such that when he retired as an umpire due to ill-health, the County captains wrote to the Secretary of the Marylebone Cricket Club asking him to write to Butt to express their regret at the cause.

Butt, a short man, was Sussex's wicket-keeper for twenty years. He was awarded two benefits: the matches between Sussex and Yorkshire at Hove in 1900, and between Sussex and Middlesex at Lord's in 1928.

External links

Obituary in Wisden Cricketers' Almanack

1865 births
1928 deaths
English cricketers
England Test cricketers
Sussex cricketers
Marylebone Cricket Club cricketers
English Test cricket umpires
Players cricketers
North v South cricketers
Players of the South cricketers
Home Counties cricketers
Lord Hawke's XI cricketers
Wicket-keepers